Jair Pereira Rodríguez (born 7 July 1986) is a Mexican former professional footballer who played as a centre-back.

Club career

Tampico Madero
Arose from the reserve side of Tampico Madero where he joined in 2004, playing in Ascenso MX debut in the first team on 15 September 2007 at the Tiburones Rojos de Coatzacoalcos.

Cruz Azul
After having played with Cruz Azul's reserve side, Pereira made his professional debut in the Liga MX Apertura 2011 under coach Enrique Meza as a starter against C.F. Pachuca August 3, 2011. He played all the Clausura 2012 season and as a permanent fixture forming a solid defense with Nestor Araujo On February 4, 2012, he scored his first goal against Chiapas F.C. in a winning 2–0 confrontation. On April 24, 2012, he scored his second goal against Club América in a 2–2 draw; he was sent off with a red card later in the match.

Guadalajara
On December 12, 2013, he signed with C.D. Guadalajara with a reported US$3 million transfer fee. He scored his first goal during the 2014 Apertura season against UdeG in a 3–0 win.

Querétaro
On 27 June 2019, Pereira joined Querétaro.

Career statistics

International

Honours
Cruz Azul
Copa MX: Clausura 2013

Guadalajara
Liga MX: Clausura 2017
Copa MX: Apertura 2015, Clausura 2017
Supercopa MX: 2016
CONCACAF Champions League: 2018

See also
List of people from Morelos, Mexico

References

External links
Image

1986 births
Living people
Mexico international footballers
Association football defenders
Footballers from Morelos
People from Cuautla
Tampico Madero F.C. footballers
Cruz Azul footballers
C.D. Guadalajara footballers
Querétaro F.C. footballers
Liga MX players
Ascenso MX players
2013 CONCACAF Gold Cup players
2017 CONCACAF Gold Cup players
Mexican footballers